The 2017 Lyon Open (also known as the Open Parc Auvergne-Rhône-Alpes Lyon) was a men's tennis tournament that was played on outdoor clay courts. It was the 1st edition of the Lyon Open and part of the ATP World Tour 250 series of the 2017 ATP World Tour. It took place in the city of Lyon, France, from May 21 through May 27, 2017.

Point distribution

Singles main draw entrants

Seeds 

 Rankings are as of May 15, 2017.

Other entrants 
The following players received wildcards into the singles main draw:
  Tomáš Berdych
  Juan Martín del Potro
  Gilles Simon

The following player received entry using a protected ranking:
  Thanasi Kokkinakis

The following players received entry from the qualifying draw:
  Chung Hyeon 
  Kyle Edmund 
  Gastão Elias
  Nicolás Kicker

The following players received entry as lucky losers:
  Quentin Halys
  Renzo Olivo
  Tennys Sandgren

Withdrawals 
Before the tournament
  Steve Darcis →replaced by  Tennys Sandgren
  Marcel Granollers →replaced by  Quentin Halys
  Nicolas Mahut →replaced by  Renzo Olivo

Doubles main draw entrants

Seeds

 Rankings are as of May 15, 2017.

Other entrants
The following pairs received wildcards into the doubles main draw:
  Jeevan Nedunchezhiyan /  Christopher Rungkat 
  Benoît Paire /  Thomas Paire

The following pair received entry as alternates:
  Carlos Berlocq /  Andreas Seppi

Withdrawals
Before the tournament
  Marcel Granollers

Finals

Singles

  Jo-Wilfried Tsonga defeated  Tomáš Berdych,  7–6(7–2), 7–5

Doubles

  Andrés Molteni /  Adil Shamasdin defeated  Marcus Daniell /  Marcelo Demoliner, 6–3, 3–6, [10–5]

References

Lyon Open
2017
Lyon Open
Lyon Open